The Big Ten Conference women's basketball tournament is held annually at the end of the women's college basketball regular season.  The tournament has been played each year since 1995.  The winner of the tournament is designated the Big Ten Tournament Champion, and receives the conference's automatic bid to the NCAA women's basketball tournament. The tournament is typically held the first week of March with games played Wednesday thru Sunday.

The Big Ten did not begin sponsoring women's basketball until the 1982–83 basketball season. In February 1982 during the 1981–82 season, the conference held a tournament at Michigan State in which Ohio State defeated Illinois 69–66 in the championship game. The conference has listed this in some publications as a regular season championship.

Maryland and Rutgers joined the Big Ten Conference for the 2014–15 season bringing the conference to 14 teams. The 2015 Big Ten Conference tournament was the first for each school with Maryland winning their first tournament title in their debut season.

The Big Ten Network broadcasts the first round, second round, quarterfinals and semifinals of the tournament, with the championship game on the ESPN family of networks. Starting in 2024, the final will air on CBS.

Results

Championships by school

See also

Big Ten Conference Men's Basketball regular season champions
Big Ten men's basketball tournament
Big Ten Conference Women's Basketball regular season champions

References

External links
 2007 Bracket showing seed matchups and television schedule

 
Basketball in Indianapolis